Rilindja Idrettslag is a Norwegian association football club from Oslo. 

Founded by Albanian diaspora in the Norwegian capital in 1987, the word Rilindja means Renaissance in the Albanian language. The clubrooms are located at Trosterud, whereas their homefield is Bjølsen stadion.

The men's football team currently plays in the Fourth Division, the fifth tier of Norwegian football. Having languished on even lower tiers throughout the club's existence, since contesting the league system for the first time in 1990, in 2012 they hired David Brocken as part-time coach. The team advanced to the fifth tier, and in 2015 the team advanced to the first round of the Norwegian football cup.

References

External links
 Official site 
 Haugerud Kunstgress - Nordic Stadiums

Football clubs in Norway
Sport in Oslo
Association football clubs established in 1987
1987 establishments in Norway
Diaspora sports clubs